Tekle Haymanot or Takla Haymanot is the name of several famous Ethiopians:

Tekle Haymanot I of Ethiopia, Emperor of Ethiopia
Tekle Haymanot II of Ethiopia, Emperor of Ethiopia
Tekle Haymanot of Gondar, pretender to the throne
Tekle Haymanot of Gojjam, appointed King (Negus) of Gojjam and Kaffa by Emperor Yohannes IV

All the above are named after a medieval Ethiopian Saint:

Tekle Haymanot (c. 1215 – c. 1313), Ethiopian monk
Hailu Tekle Haymanot (1868–1950), Ethiopian noble and army commander

See also
Abuna Takla Haymanot, Ethiopian Patriarch from 1976 to 1988
Mara Takla Haymanot, founder of the Zagwe dynasty
Teklehaimanot (disambiguation)